Karin Månsdotter is a 1954 Swedish historical drama film directed by Alf Sjöberg. It is based on the play Erik XIV by August Strindberg.

Plot
Karin Mansdotter is the daughter of an ordinary soldier. Still King Erik of Sweden falls madly in love with her. This turn of fate is appreciated by his adviser Göran Persson because he lives in constant fear the nobles could find a way to increase their influence on the king. When Erik's plan to marry English princess Elizabeth Tudor fails, Persson condones Erik's decision to make Karin his Queen. The Swedish nobility resents this wedding. The isolated King eventually shows signs of distress which are used against him. In the end he is dethroned and replaced by his brother while Persson gets decapitated for treason.

Cast
 Ulla Jacobsson as Karin Månsdotter
 Jarl Kulle as King Erik of Sweden
 Ulf Palme as Göran Persson
 Olof Widgren as Castle vicar
 Stig Järrel as Olof Gustafsson Stenbock
 Erik Strandmark as Welam Welamsson
 Bengt Blomgren as Max
 Kurt-Olof Sundström as Hertig Johan
 Åke Claesson as Svante Sture
 Per Oscarsson as Anders
 Birgitta Valberg as Queen Dowager
 Ulla Sjöblom as Agda
 Aurore Palmgren as Göran Persson's mother (as Aurora Palmgren)

References

External links
 
 

1950s historical drama films
1954 films
1954 drama films
Films based on works by August Strindberg
Swedish black-and-white films
Swedish films based on plays
Films directed by Alf Sjöberg
Swedish historical drama films
1950s Swedish-language films
Films set in the 16th century
1950s Swedish films